A sawyer (occupation) is someone who saws wood.
Sawyer, a fallen tree stuck on the bottom of a river, where it constitutes a danger to boating.

Places in the United States

Communities
Sawyer, Kansas
Sawyer, Kentucky
Sawyer, Michigan
Sawyer, Minnesota
Sawyer, Nebraska
Sawyer, New York
Sawyer, North Dakota
Sawyer, Oklahoma
Sawyer, Washington
Sawyer County, Wisconsin

Streams
Sawyer Kill, in New York
Sawyer River, in New Hampshire

People
Sawyer (given name)
Sawyer (surname)

Fictional characters
Annie Sawyer, one of the three main protagonists of the television series Being Human
Buz Sawyer, title character of a long-running comic strip
Tom Sawyer, Mark Twain's famous literary character in multiple books
James "Sawyer" Ford, a character on the ABC television show Lost
Peyton Sawyer, a fictional character on the hit television show One Tree Hill

Veronica Sawyer, the protagonist of the film and musical Heathers
Sawyer, recurring character and rival of Ash Ketchum in the anime series Pokémon: XY 
Sawyer, a fictional zombie on the Canadian animated series Camp Lakebottom
Sawyer, a female white cat in Cats Don't Dance
Lila Sawyer, a character in Hey Arnold!

Other
Sawyer beetles, the longhorn beetle genus Monochamus
Sawyer Brown, country music band
Sawyer (band), Scottish rock band
Sawyer (robot), a robot build by Rethink Robotics

See also
Sawyers (disambiguation)